Bordoloi is one of the surnames used among the Assamese Brahmins, Kalitas, Tiwas, Chutias of Assam. Notable people with the surname include:

Gopinath Bordoloi, Indian politician
Lachit Bordoloi, Indian writer
Nirmal Prabha Bordoloi, Indian poet
Nishanta Bordoloi, Indian cricketer
Padmanav Bordoloi, Indian musician
Pradyut Bordoloi, Indian politician
Rajanikanta Bordoloi, Indian writer
Robin Bordoloi, Indian politician

See also
Lokpriya Gopinath Bordoloi International Airport
Bordoloi Trophy

Notes

References

 

Assamese-language surnames